Muzz Skillings (born January 6, 1964, in Queens, New York) is an American bassist, singer, guitarist and songwriter. He is best known for being the original bassist with Living Colour.

Skillings played bass, sang backing vocals, and co-wrote songs on the Grammy award-winning 1988 debut album Vivid, the Grammy award-winning 1990 follow up Time's Up, and the 1991 EP Biscuits. His use of melodic, complex and moving bass lines during his time with Living Colour left him with high acclaim from musicians worldwide.

Skillings's departure from the band in 1992 was due to musical differences and a desire to branch off and evolve musically outside of Living Colour. He left under good terms (as indicated in his liner notes printed in the album sleeve of Living Colour's 1995 best-of compilation, Pride) and has returned to the band on occasion to substitute for their current bassist Doug Wimbish.

Skillings has since led a band called Medicine Stick, in which he plays electric guitar and sings lead vocals, as well as writes the songs.

Discography

with Living Colour

Vivid (1988)
Time's Up (1990)
Biscuits (EP) (1991)
Live from CBGB's (2005) - Recorded live on 19 December 1989

References 

American heavy metal bass guitarists
American male bass guitarists
African-American rock musicians
African-American male singer-songwriters
Alternative metal bass guitarists
Living people
Living Colour members
1964 births
20th-century American bass guitarists
African-American guitarists
20th-century African-American male singers
21st-century African-American male singers